Park Gyu-ri (born May 21, 1988), better known by the mononym Gyuri, is a South Korean singer, actress, and radio personality. She is a member of South Korean girl group Kara.

Life and career

1988–2002: Early life and career beginnings 
Park Gyu-ri was born on May 21, 1988, in Seoul, South Korea. She became a child actress with her first television appearance in the 1995 series Today is a Nice Day, in which she played the girlfriend of Kang Ho-dong's brother. In 2001, Park appeared as the teenage version of Kim Jung-eun's character in Ladies of the Palace.

2007–2010: Breakthrough with Kara
She debuted as part of the four-member girl group Kara on March 29, 2007. As the leader of the group, Park came up with its name, which comes from the Greek word chara (lit. "joy"). Kara underwent a number of lineup changes, but gained commercial success.

In 2009, she became a permanent guest on the reality television show Star Golden Bell.

Park featured in a duet with Hong Kyung-min titled "Day After" on his tenth album Special Edition, released on February 4, 2010. On April 21 that year, it was announced that she would become a radio DJ alongside Shindong on the MBC talk show ShimShimTapa after Kim Shin-young left. Their first broadcast aired on May 5, 2010. On September 26, 2011, Park announced that she would no longer DJ the show due to her busy schedule. Her last broadcast was on October 2, 2011.

2011–present: Solo activities and rising popularity
On January 19, 2011, Park was the only member of Kara to remain with their label DSP Media during a contract dispute in which the other members released a statement announcing they were terminating their contract with their label. The contract dispute was later resolved. She was the voice of Kate in the Korean dub of Alpha and Omega, released in February 2011. On May 7, Park gave a lecture on her career in the entertainment industry at Seo Woon High School in Incheon, and on July 13, she hosted the "Music Bank in Tokyo K-Pop Festival". On July 15, she joined the cast of 200 Pounds Beauty Musical, which was shown in Japanese theaters. In November, Park was diagnosed with vocal fold nodules, but nevertheless continued to rehearse for the musical. She also hosted the "Seoul-Tokyo Music Festival 2011" on November 9. The musical ran for six performances in Korea from December 6–17. According to the show's production company, Show Note, the musical brought in significantly higher numbers of male audience members than average. Following the musical's successful run, Park underwent vocal cord surgery on February 21, 2012. In 2012, she co-hosted the 26th Golden Disc Awards at the Osaka Dome in Japan.

On February 23, 2013, she hosted the Yang Yang K-Pop Festival at Naksan Beach. On June 2, Park hosted SGC Super Live 2013 in Tokyo.

In 2014, she was cast in the film Two Rooms, Two Nights.

On January 15, 2016, Park's contract with DSP Media expired. However, she stated that Kara had not disbanded even though its members were now under separate agencies, and that they hoped to collaborate on an album when the opportunity arose in the future. She then joined Motion Media to pursue a career in acting. The same year, Park was cast in the historical drama Jang Yeong-sil.

In 2018, she was cast in the film Miyak.

Discography

As a featured artist

Soundtrack appearances

Charted singles

Filmography

Film

Television

Drama

Reality

Theatre and radio

Musical theatre

Radio shows

Ambassadorship 
 7th Ulju Mountain Film Festival Ambassador (2022) with  Um Hong-gil

Awards and nominations

References

External links 

 Park Gyu-ri at  Creative Kkot
 
 

1988 births
Living people
Actresses from Seoul
Dongduk Women's University alumni
Japanese-language singers of South Korea
Kara (South Korean group) members
Singers from Seoul
South Korean Buddhists
South Korean child actresses
South Korean dance musicians
South Korean female idols
South Korean rhythm and blues singers
South Korean women pop singers
South Korean film actresses
South Korean musical theatre actresses
South Korean radio presenters
South Korean sopranos
South Korean television actresses
South Korean women television presenters
South Korean voice actresses
DSP Media artists
20th-century South Korean women singers
21st-century South Korean women singers
South Korean women radio presenters
Anyang Arts High School alumni